The Daytona Beach Bandshell is an amphitheatre in Daytona Beach, Florida, United States. It is located at Ocean Avenue, north of the junction of Main Street and Atlantic Avenue. On March 5, 1999, it was added to the U.S. National Register of Historic Places. On April 18, 2012, the AIA's Florida Chapter placed the Daytona Beach Bandshell on its list of Florida Architecture: 100 Years. 100 Places.

This property is part of the Daytona Beach Multiple Property Submission to the National Register.

History
In the 1920s, residents of Daytona Beach considered this area to be run-down and held discussions on ways to improve it.

In 1936, WPA workers began construction on this community-use project that was to cost Daytona Beach $84,000, the federal government $184,000, and be completed in 1938. Originally known as "Broadwalk", common usage gradually changed the name to the boardwalk.

The first facility constructed was the 48 foot by 114 foot natural coquina rock bandshell which seats 4,500. This was begun in September, 1936, and was completed in time for the first program to be presented on July 4, 1937. Open air concerts, as well as other programs, are still presented in the bandshell. The other structures in the boardwalk area are a clock tower, kiosk, concession facilities, restrooms, subway entrances (now closed), and an elevated walk from Earl to Ora Streets.

A local city orchestra, under Everett Allyn Moses, began in 1947. They gave summer concerts in the Bandshell and winter concerts at the city recreation hall. Moses also organized a Junior Orchestra. William P. Schueler became the director of both orchestras after Moses retired in 1952.

The bandshell, with the ocean for a backdrop, served as the site of an Oct. 5, 1992, campaign rally attended by presidential candidate Bill Clinton and running mate Al Gore and their wives, one of several stops during their cross-state bus tour through Florida a month before the 1992 election. The capacity is 5,000.

MTV Spring Break used to hold concerts at the Bandshell in Daytona. In 1987, Crowded House, The Fixx, and Blink-182 are among the acts to have played at the venue as part of the events.

Images

References

External links

 Daytona Beach Bandshell - official site
 Volusia County listings at National Register of Historic Places
 Daytona Beach Bandshell at Florida's Office of Cultural and Historical Programs
 Friends of the Daytona Beach Bandshell

National Register of Historic Places in Volusia County, Florida
Buildings and structures completed in 1937
Buildings and structures in Daytona Beach, Florida
Music venues in Florida
Tourist attractions in Daytona Beach, Florida
Event venues on the National Register of Historic Places in Florida
Works Progress Administration in Florida
Amphitheaters on the National Register of Historic Places